Ceylalictus horni is a species of bee in the genus Ceylalictus, of the family Halictidae.

References
 http://animaldiversity.org/accounts/Ceylalictus_horni/classification/
 https://www.itis.gov/servlet/SingleRpt/SingleRpt?search_topic=TSN&search_value=757419
 https://www.gbif.org/species/1352683

Halictidae
Hymenoptera of Asia
Insects of Sri Lanka
Insects described in 1913